Patricia M. Schulte  is a Canadian zoologist who is a Professor of Zoology at the University of British Columbia.  Her research considers physiology, genomics and population genetics. Schulte is a Fellow of the Royal Society of Canada and the former President of the Canadian Society of Zoologists.

Early life and education 
Schulte completed her undergraduate studies at the University of British Columbia. She moved to Stanford University for her doctoral research, where she studied the regulation and function of transcriptional Lactate dehydrogenase b in Fundulus heteroclitus.

Research and career 
Schulte is an evolutionary physiologist who studies how changes in the environment impact fish. Schulte has studied the killifish common to the East Coast of Canada. These fish experience extreme coastal gradients, significantly more than their North American counterparts. These changes in temperature have marked impact on the physiology and behaviour of killifish.

Schulte has also studied rainbow trout and the impact of human activity. She has investigated the genetic variants that leave certain rainbow trout susceptible to climate-change relevant stressors.  Her research has informed guidance on rainbow trout conservation and the operation of fisheries. Three-spined stickleback exist in both freshwater and marine environments, and the two forms come into contact in the streams of British Columbia. Schulte has investigated how the sticklebacks adapt to new environments, such as changes in salinity, temperature or the types of predators. 

Schulte is committed to educational research. She has been awarded the UBC Science Undergraduate Society Awards for Excellence in Teaching. She serves executive team of the Carl Wieman Science Education Initiative.

Awards and honours 
 2007 President of the Canadian Society of Zoologists
 2015 Peter Wall Institute for Advanced Studies Peter Wall Scholar
 2016 American Fisheries Society Award for Excellence
 2019 Elected Fellow of the Royal Society of Canada
 2019 University of British Columbia Killam Research Prize

Selected publications

References 

Living people
Year of birth missing (living people)
Academic staff of the University of British Columbia
Canadian women scientists
Fellows of the Royal Society of Canada
University of British Columbia alumni
Stanford University alumni
Women zoologists
Presidents of the Canadian Society of Zoologists